Armatophallus akagericus is a moth of the family Gelechiidae. It is found in Rwanda.

The wingspan is 13.2–13.4 mm. The forewings are grey, with the veins in the cell and sub-apical area with reddish-brown irroration. The costal margin is mottled with black, a black spot at the base of the costal margin, another black spot at the base at mid-width and three black dots in the cell (two in the middle and one in the corner). There is also an elongate black spot at two-thirds of the costal margin, as well as a diffuse whitish spot at three-fourths of the costa. The hindwings are grey. Adults have been recorded on wing in September.

Etymology
The species name refers to the Akagera National Park, the type locality.

References

Moths described in 2015
Armatophallus